Gaiziapis is a genus of East Asian araneomorph spiders in the family Anapidae, first described by J. A. Miller, C. E. Griswold & C. M. Yin in 2009.  it contains only two species, both found in China.

References

Anapidae
Araneomorphae genera
Spiders of China